Leandro Câmara do Amaral (born 6 August 1977), is a Brazilian former footballer who played as a striker.

Career statistics

Club

Honours

Club
Fiorentina
Coppa Italia (1): 2000–01

Individual
Bola de Prata (1): 2007

References

External links
 Zerozero.pt
 Guardian Stats Centre

1977 births
Living people
Association football forwards
Brazilian footballers
Brazil international footballers
2001 FIFA Confederations Cup players
Associação Portuguesa de Desportos players
ACF Fiorentina players
Grêmio Foot-Ball Porto Alegrense players
São Paulo FC players
Sociedade Esportiva Palmeiras players
Sport Club Corinthians Paulista players
Ituano FC players
FC Istres players
Fluminense FC players
CR Vasco da Gama players
CR Flamengo footballers
Campeonato Brasileiro Série A players
Serie A players
Ligue 1 players
Expatriate footballers in Italy
Expatriate footballers in France
Brazilian expatriate footballers
Footballers from São Paulo